Froesiodendron is a genus of flowering plants in the custard apple and soursop family Annonaceae, with all species native to South America.

Species
Species currently accepted by The Plant List are as follows: 
Froesiodendron amazonicum R.E.Fr.
Froesiodendron longicuspe (R.E.Fr.) N.A.Murray
Froesiodendron urceocalyx N.A.Murray

References

Annonaceae genera
Annonaceae